Danish School of Media and Journalism, or DMJX for short, is a Danish organization for higher education in, and a knowledge centre of, media and journalism. DMJX has two campuses; one in Copenhagen and one in Aarhus.

In 2004, DMJX and Aarhus University established the Centre for University Studies in Journalism, which offers master's courses at university level.

Campuses 
Danish School of Media and Journalism is a fusion of two formerly independent organizations and institutions in Aarhus and Copenhagen in January 2008. The Aarhus department is known as The Danish School of Journalism (Danmarks Journalisthøjskole, or DJH) and was established in 1946. In 1973, the school moved its address to Christiansbjerg, and it moved to its current location on Katrinebjerg in 2020. The Copenhagen department, situated in Emdrup, is known as The Media School (Mediehøjskolen, formerly Den Grafiske Højskole) and was established in 1943.

The Danish School of Journalism in Aarhus is the oldest and the largest educational institution of Denmark offering journalism courses. The school's former premises in the neighborhood of Christiansbjerg was built in 1973, designed by native architectural firm Kjær & Richter. It was situated next to the Aarhus department of Danmarks Radio in a large business district, Business Park Skejby.

Notable alumni 
 Mads Ellesøe
 Natasja Crone Back

References

External links 

Aarhus N
Journalism schools in Europe
Higher education in Aarhus
1971 establishments in Denmark
Educational institutions established in 1971
Danish journalism organizations